Burlton The ancestors of the Burlton surname lived among the ancient Anglo-Saxon culture. The name comes from when they lived in the village of Burleston in Dorset.

The surname Burlton was first found in Dorset, where they held a family seat from ancient times.

Before English spelling was standardized a few hundred years ago, spelling variations of names were a common occurrence. Elements of Latin, French and other languages became incorporated into English through the Middle Ages, and name spellings changed even among the literate. The variations of the surname Burlton include Burleson, Burleston, Burlison, Burlyson, Burlson and many more.

 Notable people with the surname include:

Arthur Burlton (1900–1980), Indian-born English cricketer
George Burlton (died 1815), Royal Navy admiral

See also
Burton (name)